Eliza Marian Butler (29 December 1885 – 13 November 1959), who published as E. M. Butler and Elizabeth M. Butler, was an English scholar of German, Schröder Professor of German at the University of Cambridge from 1945. Her most influential book was The Tyranny of Greece over Germany (1935), in which she wrote that Germany has had "too much exposure to Ancient Greek literature and art. The result was that the German mind had succumbed to 'the tyranny of an ideal'. The German worship of Ancient Greece had emboldened the Nazis to remake Europe in their image." It was controversial in Britain and its translation was banned in Germany.

Life

Eliza Butler, known as "Elsie", was born in Bardsea, Lancashire in a family of Irish ancestry. She was educated by a Norwegian governess (from whom she learned German) and subsequently in Hannover from age 11, Paris from age 15, the school of domestic science at Reifenstein Abbey from age 18, and Newnham College, Cambridge from 21. As a teenager, she watched Kaiser Wilhelm II inspect his troops. In the First World War she worked as an interpreter and nurse in Scottish units on the Russian and Macedonian fronts (she had learned Russian from Jane Harrison) and treated the victims of the German assault. From 1926 to her death Butler lived and travelled with her companion Isaline Blew Horner. After working in hospitals, she taught at Cambridge and in 1936 became a professor at the University of Manchester. Her works include a trilogy on ritual magic and the occult, especially in the Faust legend (1948–1952).

Butler also wrote novels. Her autobiography, Paper Boats, was published by William Collins, Sons in 1959, the year of her death. She died in London on 13 November 1959.

She may have inspired the scholar Suzanne L. Marchand to research German Orientalism, as Marchand emphasized the political overtones of Orientalistik, in reaction to Edward Said's assumption that Germany has had a mostly "classical" interest in the Orient (Said overlooked Germany in his Orientalism).

Selected works

 The Saint-Simonian Religion (Cambridge: Cambridge University Press, 1926)
 The Tempestuous Prince (Cambridge: Cambridge University Press, 1929)
 Sheridan: A Ghost Story (London: Constable, 1931)
 The Tyranny of Greece Over Germany: A Study of the Influence Exercised by Greek Art and Poetry Over the Great German Writers of the Eighteenth, Nineteenth and Twentieth Centuries (Cambridge University Press, 1935; repr. Boston: Beacon, 1958, and Cambridge, MA: Cambridge University Press, 2012).
 Rainer Maria Rilke (Cambridge: Cambridge University Press, 1941; repr. Cambridge: Cambridge University Press, 1946)
 The Myth of the Magus (Cambridge: Cambridge University Press, 1947)
 Ritual Magic (University Park: The Pennsylvania State University Press, 1949; reimpression 1998)
 Daylight in a Dream (London: The Hogarth Press, 1951)
 Silver Wings (London: The Hogarth Press, 1952)
 The Fortunes of Faust The Pennsylvania State University Press (reimpression 1952)
 Paper Boats (London: Collins, 1959), a volume of reminiscences

See also

References

External links
 Eliza Marian Butler at The Peerage

1885 births
1959 deaths
Germanists
Alumni of Newnham College, Cambridge
Academics of the Victoria University of Manchester
Academics of the University of Cambridge
People from Lancashire (before 1974)